Clipchamp is an online video editing tool owned by Microsoft and created by the Australian company, Clipchamp Pty Ltd. This non-linear editing software is designed for the user to import, edit, and export audiovisual material in an Internet browser window.

Clipchamp in 2021 has offices in Australia, the Philippines, Germany, and the USA. According to figures published by the company, at the beginning of 2021, it had more than fourteen million users worldwide, with the majority of users from countries such as Brazil, India, Mexico, and the USA.

History

Beginning 
Clipchamp Pty Ltd was founded as a Startup—a small or medium-sized tech company—by Alexander Dreiling (current CEO), Dave Hewitt, Tobias Raub and Soeren Balko, in Brisbane, Australia, in 2013.

In an interview given to the SmartCompany (2019) website, Dreiling commented that at first, the company was “…trying to build an enormous, distributed supercomputer”. Among the first software developed by the company’s team was a tool for video compression and conversion

Software launch 
2014 saw the official launch of the first version of the free, audiovisual browser-based software on the Clipchamp platform. When the supercomputer project ground to a halt, the team decided to keep going with the video programming technology, which was, in the words of Dreiling “...a tool that worked on Chromebooks”.

Second version of the editor 
According to The Wallstreet Journal (2016), in June 2016, Clipchamp was valued at 1.1 million dollars. In the same month, the second version of the Clipchamp online video editor was launched internationally. By 2018, the firm had amassed 6.5 million users, attracting investors such as Steve Baxter, who invested one million dollars (Palmer-Derrien, 2019)

Current company figures 
In 2020, Clipchamp set up a base in Seattle, USA, after achieving capital of 13.2 million dollars, from alliances made with investment funds such as Transition Level Investments, Tola Capital and TEN13, among others (Redrup, 2020). In February 2021, Clipchamp published on its website that it has 14 million users worldwide, registered in 250 countries and territories. At that time, the company announced that it had an audiovisual library of 800,000 files.

Acquisition by Microsoft 
On the 7th of September, 2021 Microsoft announced the acquisition of Clipchamp. In a press release, they expressed their interest in learning more about the video content creation market. Clipchamp was later integrated as part of Windows 11 on March 9, 2022.

References

See also 
 List of video editing software
 Comparison of video editing software

2013 software
Microsoft software
Microsoft acquisitions
Windows software
Video editing software for Windows
Video editing software
Web applications
2021 mergers and acquisitions
Windows components